is a railway station on the Sasshō Line in Kita-ku, Sapporo, Hokkaido, Japan, operated by the Hokkaido Railway Company (JR Hokkaido). The station is numbered G07.

Lines

Station layout
The station has two side platforms serving two tracks, connected by a passenger footbridge. The station has automated ticket machines and Kitaca card readers. The station is unattended.

History

Surrounding area
 National Route 231 (to Rumoi)
 Yurigahara Park
 Taihei Yurigahara Community Center
 Kita Police Station, Taihei
 Sapporo Taihei Post Office
 Akatsuki Transportation Office

See also
 List of railway stations in Japan

References

External links

Railway stations in Sapporo
Stations of Hokkaido Railway Company
Kita-ku, Sapporo
Railway stations in Japan opened in 1986